The 1974 San Diego Padres season was the sixth in franchise history. The team finished last in the National League West with a record of 60–102, 42 games behind the Los Angeles Dodgers.

Offseason 
 October 25, 1973: Mike Caldwell was traded by the Padres to the San Francisco Giants for Willie McCovey and Bernie Williams.
 November 7, 1973: Jerry Morales was traded by the Padres to the Chicago Cubs for Glenn Beckert and Bobby Fenwick.

Regular season 
In his first home game as the Padres' new owner in 1974, Ray Kroc grabbed the public address system microphone and apologized to fans for the poor performance of the team, saying, "I've never seen such stupid ballplaying in my life." At the same time, a streaker raced across the field, eluding security personnel. Kroc shouted, "Throw him in jail!"

Opening Day starters 
Steve Arlin
Glenn Beckert
Nate Colbert
Johnny Grubb
Enzo Hernández
Fred Kendall
Willie McCovey
Derrel Thomas
Bobby Tolan

Season standings

Record vs. opponents

Notable transactions 
 May 31, 1974: Horace Clarke and Lowell Palmer was purchased by the Padres from the New York Yankees.
 June 5, 1974: 1974 Major League Baseball draft
Bill Almon was drafted by the Padres in the 1st round (1st pick). 
Lenn Sakata was drafted by the Padres in the 5th round, but did not sign.
Bump Wills was drafted by the Padres in the 12th round, but did not sign.

Roster

Player stats

Batting

Starters by position 
Note: Pos = Position; G = Games played; AB = At bats; H = Hits; Avg. = Batting average; HR = Home runs; RBI = Runs batted in

Other batters 
Note: G = Games played; AB = At bats; H = Hits; Avg. = Batting average; HR = Home runs; RBI = Runs batted in

Pitching

Starting pitchers 
Note: G = Games pitched; IP = Innings pitched; W = Wins; L = Losses; ERA = Earned run average; SO = Strikeouts

Other pitchers 
Note: G = Games pitched; IP = Innings pitched; W = Wins; L = Losses; ERA = Earned run average; SO = Strikeouts

Relief pitchers 
Note: G = Games pitched; W = Wins; L = Losses; SV = Saves; ERA = Earned run average; SO = Strikeouts

Awards and honors 

1974 Major League Baseball All-Star Game
 Johnny Grubb, OF, reserve

Farm system

References

External links
 1974 San Diego Padres at Baseball Reference
 1974 San Diego Padres at Baseball Almanac

San Diego Padres seasons
San Diego Padres season
San Diego Padres